Luiza is a territory of Kasai-Central province of the Democratic Republic of the Congo. It covers an area of 14,702 square kilometers. As of March 2021, its inhabitants numbered 1,515,339. It is represented in the National Assembly by four elected deputies.

The climate designation is tropical savannah with dry winters.

References
 

Territories of Kasaï-Central Province
Democratic Republic of Congo geography articles needing translation from French Wikipedia